Allan Herbert Stanley (March 1, 1926 – October 18, 2013) was a Canadian professional ice hockey defenceman who played for the New York Rangers, Chicago Blackhawks, Boston Bruins, Philadelphia Flyers and Toronto Maple Leafs of the National Hockey League between 1948 and 1969. A four-times Stanley Cup winner and three-times member of the second NHL All-Star team, Stanley was inducted to the Hockey Hall of Fame in 1981.

Playing career
 

Stanley spent the 1943 through 1948 seasons with various teams including the Boston Olympics of the EHL, Porcupine Combines of the NOHA and the Providence Reds of AHL.  He finally began his storied NHL career in 1948–49 with the New York Rangers.
    
He played five years in New York before spending the 1953–54 season in the WHL with Vancouver.  Stanley started his 1954–55 season in New York with the Rangers and was soon traded to the Chicago Black Hawks where he finished that season and the next.

Stanley spent the 1956–57 and 1957–58 season with the Boston Bruins then went on to spend ten years with the Toronto Maple Leafs, where he would be named one of the team's alternate captains. He acquired the nicknames "Snowshoes" and "Silent Sam" for his slow, plodding skating style, although he was a strong stay-at-home defender and an important part of the Leafs teams which won four Stanley Cups in six years in the 1960s in 1962, 1963, 1964, 1967.

After the 1967 Cup win, Stanley finished off his career playing for the Philadelphia Flyers in 1968–69.

In 1,244 NHL regular-season games, Stanley scored 100 goals, 333 assists for a total of 433 points.  He had a total of 792 minutes in the penalty box. He was inducted into the Hockey Hall of Fame in 1981.

Awards and achievements
Named to the NHL second All-Star team in 1960, 1961, and 1966
Won the Stanley Cup in 1962, 1963, 1964, and 1967
 In the 2009 book 100 Ranger Greats, was ranked No. 60 all-time of the 901 New York Rangers who had played during the team's first 82 seasons

Career statistics

Regular season and playoffs

See also
 List of NHL players with 1000 games played

References

External links

 
 

1926 births
2013 deaths
Boston Bruins players
Boston Olympics players
Canadian ice hockey defencemen
Chicago Blackhawks players
Hockey Hall of Fame inductees
Ice hockey people from Ontario
New York Rangers players
Philadelphia Flyers players
Providence Reds players
Sportspeople from Timmins
Stanley Cup champions
Toronto Maple Leafs players
Vancouver Canucks (WHL) players